Standings and results for Group 7 of the UEFA Euro 1988 qualifying tournament.

Group 7 consisted of Belgium, Bulgaria, Luxembourg, Republic of Ireland and Scotland. Group winners were Republic of Ireland, who finished one point clear of second-placed Bulgaria.  It was Ireland's first appearance in the final stages of a major tournament: while Belgium, who had recently taken fourth place in the 1986 World Cup, were group favourites but importantly failed to win any of their matches against either Ireland or Bulgaria, who both finished ahead of them.  Scotland, who finished fourth, had started the group badly but as soon as qualification was a mathematical impossibility, they made a late run in which they scored victories over both Belgium and Bulgaria: the latter, a victory with a late goal four minutes from time, secured Ireland's place in the finals after Ireland had finished all their matches, when a draw would have handed the group to Bulgaria on goal difference.  Then with typical perversity, Scotland faltered in their final match against minnows Luxembourg, a 0-0 draw handing them their only point of the campaign when a victory would have put them certainly into third place and possibly second.

Final table

Results

Goalscorers

References
UEFA Page
RSSSF Page

Group 7
1986–87 in Scottish football
1987–88 in Scottish football
1986–87 in Republic of Ireland association football
Qual
1986–87 in Bulgarian football
1987–88 in Bulgarian football
1986–87 in Belgian football
1987–88 in Belgian football
football
football